The Saint-Petersburg International Mercantile Exchange (SPIMEX) is a Russian commodity exchange that was incorporated in 2008. It has offices in Moscow, Saint Petersburg and Irkutsk.

General 

SPIMEX offers a wide range of products in exchange-traded refined products, crude oil, natural gas, timber and construction materials as well as derivatives. Its Refined Products Section focuses on spot contracts for all types of domestically traded refined products delivered from a great variety of designated locations executed under the uniform rules. Its Derivatives Section focuses on cash-settled futures on the SPIMEX indices for exchange-traded refined products, physically settled futures on refined products and physically settled SPIMEX Urals Crude Futures.

The clearing organization associated with SPIMEX is SDCO (Settlement Depository Company).

SPIMEX calculates price indices for domestic exchange-traded and OTC-traded refined products.

In 2016, the volume traded at the SPIMEX Refined Products Section (gasoline, diesel, jet fuel, fuel oil and petrochemicals) was equal to 17.16 million tonnes; at the SPIMEX Derivatives Section – RUB 2.475 billion and at the SPIMEX Natural Gas Section – 16.71 bcm.

The overall 2021 turnover of all the SPIMEX trading sections grew 39.5% year-on-year (YoY) up to RUB 1.494 trillion. The volume traded in the SPIMEX Refined Products Section amounted to 27.030 million tonnes (MMT) rising by 16.6% YoY, while the turnover stood at RUB 1.362 trillion ($17.78 bln) enjoying a 39.8% rise YoY.

In March 2022, the Association of European Energy Exchanges (Europex) excluded SPIMEX from its membership due to Russia's invasion of Ukraine.

Until 2022, the requirements of the Russian government for oil companies to sell part of their products through SPIMEX were in effect. According to these requirements, 11 % of gasoline production, 7.5 % of diesel fuel, 11 % of jet fuel, 3 % of fuel oil production and 7.5 % of LPG were subject to sale through the exchange.

Commodities traded 

SPIMEX has been trading: 
 refined products — since 2008
 refined products futures — since 2010
 crude oil — since 2013
 natural gas — since 2014
 timber — since 2014
 crude oil futures – since 2016
 mineral fertilizer – since 2017

Fast facts 

 Since 2011, SPIMEX has been registering OTC transactions in crude oil, refined products, coal, natural gas and LPG.
 SPIMEX calculates price indices for domestic exchange-traded and OTC-traded refined products.
 Since 2012, the SPIMEX Indices have been used as the underlying assets for futures traded at its Derivatives Section.
 In 2014, SPIMEX launched trading in its Natural Gas Section and Timber & Construction Materials Section.
 In 2016, the volume of refined products and petrochemicals traded on SPIMEX amounted to 17.16 million tonnes.
 In 2016, the SPIMEX Urals Crude Futures contract was launched.

Refined products market 
 
SPIMEX — the primary trading venue for exchange-traded refined products in Russia.

In 2016, the volume of refined products and petrochemicals traded on SPIMEX amounted to 17.16 million tonnes. The number of trading participants exceeded 1,900 including all Russian majors; the list of SPIMEX designated delivery points include all key domestic refineries; the list of commodities accepted to trading includes all types of domestic refined products.

By 2021, the trade in petroleum products has grown to 27.03 million tons (+ 16.6% compared to 2020).

Indices 

Territorial indices	

The average price for refined products at large Russian refineries located in European Russia, the Urals & Western Siberia and Eastern Siberia & the Russian Far East.

Regional indices

The average price for refined products at 9 large domestic demand centers.

Composite index

A unified indicator of Russian domestic refined products which measures price performance of an average tonne of exchange-traded light refined products.

National indices

The average price for refined products at large refineries located all over Russia.

Crude oil market 

SPIMEX launched trading in crude oil in 2013. In 2016, the volume traded at the SPIMEX Crude Oil Section stood at 0.481 million tonnes (with the turnover amounting to RUB 6.34 bn) while the volume of procurement procedures held over the year at the TORG-i electronic trading platform operated by SPIMEX reached 2.11 million mt. Thus, the overall volume amounted to 2.59 million mt.

Derivatives market 

SPIMEX offers a variety of futures contracts (at present there are more than 20 instruments available). The volume traded at the SPIMEX Derivatives Section in 2016 reached 48,630 futures contracts in the total amount of RUB 2.475 bn.

More than 10 products are currently offered by the SPIMEX Derivatives Section, including, in particular:

 physically settled SPIMEX Urals Crude Oil Futures (FOB, Primorsk); 
 cash-settled futures on the SPIMEX indices for exchange-traded domestic market petroleum products, and
 physically settled futures on domestic market petroleum products.

Underlying commodities: crude oil; diesel; Gasoline Regular 92; Gasoline Premium 95 and the SPIMEX indices for exchange-traded petroleum products.
Physical delivery is a distinctive feature of SPIMEX commodity-based futures.

Risk Management System (RMS)

Performance of the obligations under futures contracts is guaranteed by the Clearing House.

SPIMEX Urals Crude Futures

Trading in physically settled SPIMEX Urals Crude Futures (FOB, Primorsk) was launched at the Saint-Petersburg International Mercantile Exchange (SPIMEX) on 29 November 2016.
The SPIMEX Urals Crude Futures contact has to become a core of a new pricing mechanism for exported Russian crude oil by setting a direct market quotation without reference to other marker grades.
The contract size is 1,000 bbls.
The Standard Delivery is equal to 720,000 bbls (100,000 mt).
The contract is denominated in US Dollars.
Access to trading in the SPIMEX Urals Crude Futures is granted both to residents of Russia (legal entities and individuals) and non-residents of Russia (legal entities only).
Both Russian and foreign legal entities may act as delivery makers.
The contract is physically settled and is directly linked to the underlying crude oil market. EFP procedures are possible as alternative delivery mechanism.

Natural gas market 

On 24 October 2014, SPIMEX launched trading in natural gas.

SPIMEX designated balancing points (located around compressor stations) are as follows: Nadym, Vyngapurovskaya, Yuzhno-Balykskaya and Parabel. Trading Participants include largest domestic natural gas producers and end-users (utilities, fertilizer and metallurgy companies).

In October 2015 SPIMEX launched a day-ahead contracts trades and in October 2016 - trades for delivery on national holidays and weekends.

In 2016, the volume traded at the SPIMEX Natural Gas Section amounted to 16.812 bcm (+119.8% y-o-y).

In 2021, the volume traded at the SPIMEX Natural Gas Section amounted to 6.691 bcm (-58.3% y-o-y).

Timber market 

On 11 July 2014, SPIMEX launched trading in timber. Deliveries of conifer timber traded on SPIMEX originate in the Irkutsk Region of Russia. The Exchange brings together over 60 entities, including major logging companies, forest leaseholders and timber processing businesses. SPIMEX plans to add new trading instruments, to expand geographic reach and in the long run to launch a cross-border delivery mechanism.

In 2016, the volume traded at the SPIMEX Timber & Construction Materials Section amounted to 32,250 cubic meters. The number of trades made stood at 108.

Registration of OTC transactions 

SPIMEX is authorized to register OTC transactions in the following exchange-traded commodities:
 refined products;
 crude oil;
 natural gas;
 LPG;
 coal, and 
 grain.
Data on such OTC transactions is used for calculation of the relevant SPIMEX indices.
In 2016, volumes set in the relevant OTC contacts and the number of registered OTC transactions were broken down by product as follows:
 refined products: 397,700 transactions with the total volume of 252.7 million tonnes;
 LPG – 48,000 transactions and 6.8 million mt;
 crude oil: 13,600 transactions and 581.9 million mt;
 natural gas: 9,800 transactions and 265.5 bcm;
 coal: 18,300 transactions and 663.0 million mt.
In 2016, the number of companies which registered their OTC transactions with SPIMEX grew from 152 up to 270.

Market data 

 SPIMEX distributes market data to regulators, market participants, news agencies, information vendors, research and consulting firms.
 In June 2013, SPIMEX entered into a cooperation agreement with the Federal Antimonopoly Service of Russia (FAS) on enhancing transparency in the domestic crude oil and refined products markets; 
 In June 2016, SPIMEX entered into a cooperation agreement with the Ministry of Economic Development of Russia on enhancing transparency in the domestic natural gas, crude oil and refined products markets; 
 Market data distributed by SPIMEX is based on actual transaction data (both exchange- traded and registered with SPIMEX by OTC market participants).

References

General references

External links 
 Official website
 Reuters, UPDATE 1-Russia launches Urals crude oil futures trading in Moscow, Nov 29, 2016 
 Platts, SPIMEX’s Urals futures contract: A new benchmark for Russia?, November 30, 2016 
 FOW, Spimex launches first Russian crude contract, November 30, 2016 
 ICIS, Urals grade: A new oil benchmark?
 ICIS, OUTLOOK '17: Oil price stickiness may last on strong liquidity and weak fundamentals, 21 December 2016 
 Bloomberg, Putin's Decade-Old Dream Realized as Russia to Price Its Own Oil, Apr 28, 2016

Financial services companies established in 2008
Commodity exchanges
Petroleum